Gecarcinus is the type genus of the land crab family Gecarcinidae. They are found in warmer coastal regions of the Americas, including islands in the Caribbean. Four species from oceanic islands were formerly included in Gecarcinus as the subgenus Johngarthia, but are now treated as a separate genus, Johngarthia. While all members of this genus are largely terrestrial, they have to return to the ocean to breed (the larvae are released into the sea). They are often colourful, with reddish, orange, purple, yellowish, whitish, or blackish being the dominating hues. This has resulted in some species, notably G. quadratus and G. lateralis, gaining a level of popularity in the pet trade.

Species

References

Further reading

 Bright, D., & C. Hogue. 1972. A synopsis of burrowing land crabs of the World and list of their arthropod symbionts and burrow associates. Contributions in Science. No. 220. Available online (PDF)
 Ng, P., & D. Guinot, 2001. On the land crabs of the genus Discoplax A. Milne Edwards, 1867 (Crustacea: Decapoda: Brachyura: Gecarcinidae), with description of a new cavernicolous species from the Philippines. Raffles Bull. Zool. 49: 311-338.
 Türkay, M. 1970. Die Gercarcinidae Amerikas. Mit einem Anhang uber Ucides Rathbun (Crustacea: Decapoda). Senckenberg. biol. 51: 333-354.
 Türkay, M. 1987. Landkrabben. Natur Mus. 117: 143-150.
 Perger, R., & A. Wall. 2014 The description of a new species of the Neotropical land crab genus Gecarcinus Leach, 1814 (Crustacea, Decapoda, Brachyura, Gecarcinidae). ZooKeys 435: 93–109. doi: 10.3897/zookeys.435.7271

External links

Grapsoidea
Terrestrial crustaceans